Rochelle "Shelly" Lazarus (born 1947) is the Chairman Emerita of Ogilvy & Mather.

Early life and career
Lazarus is the daughter of Lewis and Sylvia Braff and the grand daughter of May and Adolph Eisenberg. She graduated from Midwood High School in Brooklyn, NY before going to Smith College. Lazarus also obtained an MBA from Columbia Business School.  She joined Ogilvy & Mather in 1971 and became President of its U.S. direct marketing business in 1989.  She later became President of Ogilvy & Mather New York, followed by President of Ogilvy & Mather North America.  In 1995, Lazarus became president and Chief Operating Officer of the company, before becoming CEO in 1996 and Chairman in 1997.  She held the title of CEO until 2008 and continues to serve as Chairman.

Lazarus serves on the boards of General Electric, Merck & Co., New York Presbyterian Hospital, the American Museum of Natural History, The Blackstone Group, Rockefeller Capital Management, Lincoln Center for the Performing Arts, and the World Wildlife Fund.  She is also a member of the Board of Overseers for Columbia Business School.

Personal
Lazarus was married to Dr. George Mitchell Lazarus on March 22, 1970. They had three children, Theodore Pipiens, Samantha Rana May, and Benjamin Harrison Cates.

References

Columbia Business School alumni
Living people
Smith College alumni
1947 births
American women chief executives
Midwood High School alumni
20th-century American businesspeople
20th-century American businesswomen
21st-century American businesspeople
21st-century American businesswomen